Great Britain, represented by the British Olympic Association (BOA), competed at the 1956 Summer Olympics in Melbourne, Australia.  British athletes have competed in every Summer Olympic Games. 189 competitors, 163 men and 26 women, took part in 108 events in 17 sports.

The Melbourne Games saw an improvement on Great Britain and Northern Ireland's performance at the two preceding Games.  British athletes won six gold medals (up from just one in 1952).  Overall, they won twenty-four medals, finishing eighth.

Medallists

Gold
Chris Brasher — Athletics, Men's 3.000m Steeplechase
Terence Spinks — Boxing, Men's Flyweight
Richard McTaggart — Boxing, Men's Lightweight
Bertie Hill, Arthur Rook, and Francis Weldon — Equestrian, Three-Day Event Team
Gillian Sheen — Fencing, Women's Foil Individual
Judy Grinham — Swimming, Women's 100m Backstroke

Silver
Derek Johnson — Athletics, Men's 800m
Gordon Pirie — Athletics, Men's 5.000m
Jean Scrivens, Heather Armitage, June Foulds, and Anne Pashley — Athletics, Women's 4 × 100 m Relay
Thelma Hopkins — Athletics, Women's High Jump
Thomas Nicholls — Boxing, Men's Featherweight
Arthur Brittain, William Holmes, and Alan Jackson — Cycling, Men's Team Road Race
Robert Perry, David Bowker, John Dillon, and Neil Kennedy-Cochran — Sailing, Men's 5½ Meter Classo

Bronze
Derek Ibbotson — Athletics, Men's 5.000m
Michael Wheeler, Peter Higgins, Derek Johnson, and John Salisbury — Athletics, Men's 4 × 400 m Relay
Nicholas Gargano — Boxing, Men's Welterweight
John McCormack — Boxing, Men's Light Middleweight
Tom Simpson, Donald Burgess, Michael Gambrill, and John Geddes — Cycling, Men's 4.000m Team Pursuit
Alan Jackson — Cycling, Men's Individual Road Race
Francis Weldon — Equestrian, Three-Day Event Individual
Peter Robeson, Pat Smythe, and Wilf White — Equestrian, Jumping Team
Margaret Edwards — Swimming, Women's 100m Backstroke
Terence Smith and Jasper Blackall — Sailing, Men's Sharpie 12m²
Graham Mann, Ronald Backus, and Jonathan Janson — Sailing, Men's Dragon

Athletics

Men's 110m Hurdles 
Peter Hildreth
 Heat — 14.5s (→ did not advance)

Jack Parker
 Heat — 14.8s (→ did not advance)

Men's 1500m
Brian Hewson
 Final— 3:42.6 (→ 5th place)

Ian Boyd
 Final— 3:43.0 (→  8th place)

Ken Wood
 Final— 3:44.76 (→ 9th place)

Men's Marathon 
Harry Hicks — 2:39:55 (→ 15th place)
Fred Norris — did not finish (→ no ranking)
Ron Clark — did not finish (→ no ranking)

Women's Discus Throw
 Suzanne Allday
 Qualifying Round — 41.45 m (→ did not advance, 14th place)

Boxing

Men's Light Flyweight (– 48 kg)
 Owen Reilly

Men's Flyweight (– 51 kg)
 Terence Spinks

Men's Bantamweight (– 54 kg)
 Thomas Nicholls

Men's Featherweight (– 57 kg)
 Richard McTaggart

Men's Light Welterweight (– 63.5 kg)
 Nicholas Gargano

Men's Light Middleweight (– 67 kg)
 John McCormack

Men's Middleweight (– 75 kg)
 Ron Redrup

Canoeing

Cycling

Sprint
Keith Harrison — 15th place

Time trial
Alan Danson — 1:12.3 (→ 5th place)

Tandem
Eric ThompsonPeter Brotherton — 4th place

Team pursuit
Donald BurgessJohn GeddesMichael GambrillTom Simpson — 4:42.2 (→  Bronze Medal)

Team road race
Alan JacksonArthur BrittainWilliam Holmes — 23 points (→  Silver Medal)

Individual road race
Alan Jackson — 5:23:16 (→  Bronze Medal)
Arthur Brittain — 5:23:40 (→ 6th place)
William Holmes — 5:23:40 (→ 14th place)
Harold Reynolds — 5:24:44 (→ 19th place)

Diving

Men's 10m Platform
Peter Tarsey
 Preliminary Round — 68.34 (→ did not advance, 14th place)

Roy Walsh
 Preliminary Round — 62.56 (→ did not advance, 20th place)

Ray Cann
 Preliminary Round — 60.08 (→ did not advance, 21st place)

Women's 10m Platform
Ann Long
 Preliminary Round — 49.15
 Final — 76.15 (→ 7th place)

Charmain Welsh
 Preliminary Round — 46.55
 Final — 69.05 (→ 12th place)

Fencing

Nine fencers, seven men and two women, represented Great Britain in 1956.

Men's foil
 Allan Jay
 Raymond Paul
 René Paul

Men's team foil
 René Paul, Bill Hoskyns, Raymond Paul, Allan Jay, Ralph Cooperman

Men's épée
 Bill Hoskyns
 Allan Jay
 Michael Howard

Men's team épée
 René Paul, Raymond Paul, Michael Howard, Bill Hoskyns, Allan Jay

Men's sabre
 Olgierd Porebski
 Ralph Cooperman
 Bill Hoskyns

Men's team sabre
 Olgierd Porebski, Bill Hoskyns, Ralph Cooperman, Allan Jay, Raymond Paul

Women's foil
 Gillian Sheen
 Mary Glen-Haig

Football

Gymnastics

The British Gymnastics team competed in 15 events, and was made up of 14 gymnasts, (6 men and 8 women),  
including Frank Turner, competing in his third Summer Olympics.

Hockey

Modern pentathlon

Three male pentathletes represented Great Britain in 1956.

Individual
 Donald Cobley
 Thomas Hudson
 George Norman

Team
 Donald Cobley
 Thomas Hudson
 George Norman

Rowing

Great Britain had 12 male rowers participate in three out of seven rowing events in 1956.

 Men's single sculls - unplaced
 Tony Fox

 Men's double sculls - unplaced
 Sidney Rand
 Bill Rand

 Men's eight
 Richard Wheadon
 Michael Delahooke
 Ian Welsh
 Kenneth Masser
 Simon Tozer
 Alan Watson
 John A. Russell
 Christopher Davidge
 John Hinde (cox)

Sailing

Shooting

Six shooters represented Great Britain in 1956.

25 m pistol
 Henry Steele
 Frederick Cooper

50 m pistol
 Frederick Cooper
 Henry Steele

300 m rifle, three positions
 Steffen Cranmer

50 m rifle, three positions
 Steffen Cranmer
 Frederick Hopkinson

50 m rifle, prone
 Steffen Cranmer
 Frederick Hopkinson

Trap
 Joe Wheater
 Ernest Fear

Swimming

Water polo

Weightlifting

Wrestling

References

Nations at the 1956 Summer Olympics
1956
Summer Olympics